A translator is a linguist who translates documents from one language to another.

Translator may also refer to:

Music
Translator (band), a San Francisco new wave band active during the 1980s
Translator (album), a 1985 album of the band Translator

Other uses
A Translator, a 2018 Cuban film
Translator (computing), a computer program that translates programming language instructions
an alternate term for a broadcast relay station, a television or radio transmitter which rediffuses (retransmits) the signal of another television or radio station
Computer-assisted translation, software that translates source files from one language to another ("file translator") or provides gisting of copy-and-paste text

See also
The Translators, 2019 French film